Leigh Jarvis Young (March 31, 1883December 24, 1960) was a Michigan politician.

Early life
Young was born on March 31, 1883, in Albia, Iowa, to parents David Whitcomb and Mary Young.

Career
Young worked as an associate professor of forestry for the University of Michigan from 1911 to 1920. Young served as the mayor of Ann Arbor, Michigan from 1941 to 1945.

Personal life
Young married Frances Speed Graham in 1912.

Death
Young died of heart disease in the Saint Joseph Mercy Hospital in Ann Arbor, Michigan, on December 24, 1960. Young was cremated.

References

1883 births
1960 deaths
Michigan Republicans
People from Albia, Iowa
University of Michigan faculty
Mayors of Ann Arbor, Michigan
20th-century American politicians